The Nalón is the longest river in the autonomous community of Asturias, Spain, measuring . It joins the Cantabrian Sea  in San Esteban de Pravia.  Its tributaries include the Narcea River.

See also 
 List of rivers of Spain

Rivers of Asturias
Rivers of Spain